Blue Hand is a 1925 thriller novel by the British writer Edgar Wallace.

Adaptation
In 1967 it was adapted into the West German film Creature with the Blue Hand, part of Rialto Film's long running series of Wallace adaptations.

References

External links
 
 

1925 British novels
British novels adapted into films
British thriller novels
Novels by Edgar Wallace